Jang Mi-ran (born October 9, 1983) is a South Korean Olympic weightlifter. She is currently based in Goyang, Gyeonggi-do, competing for the Goyang City Government Sports Club.

At the 2004 Summer Olympics, she won the silver medal in the +75 kg category, with a total of 302.5 kg.

On September 26, 2007, Jang won her third straight world championship overall title in the women's +75 kg category by lifting 319 kg of overalls in total (138 kg in the snatch, 181 kg of overalls in the clean and jerk). She also surpassed the world record, which was set by herself in May 2006 in Wonju, Korea, by one kilogram. Mu Shuangshuang, who lifted 319 kg in overalls as well, ranked second because of bodyweight, but broke the record an attempt earlier.

At the 2008 Summer Olympics, she won the gold medal in the +75 kg category. She broke the world records in the snatch with 140 kg, in the clean and jerk with 186 kg, and combined with 326 kg.

She won the gold medal in the +75 kg division at the 2010 Guangzhou Asian Games. With this medal, which was her first gold in Asian Games, she completed the weightlifting equivalent of a "grand slam" as champion in the Summer Olympics, world championships and Asian Games.

In February 2012, Jang announced the launch of her new foundation, Jang Miran Foundation, and stated that the mission of the Jang Miran Foundation is "[to help] young athletes in minor sports."

After failing to get a medal in the 2012 London Olympics, Jang decided to retire in January 2013, saying she wanted to focus on her foundation and continuing her education at Yong In University.

In November 2016, Hripsime Khurshudyan of Armenia was stripped of her bronze medal for doping, allowing Jang to move into 3rd place for the Women's 75+ kg Weightlifting Division at the London 2012 Summer Olympics.

2016 MBC drama Weightlifting Fairy Kim Bok-joo is inspired by the real-life story of Jang.

Major results

Notes and references

External links
 
 
 
 
 

1983 births
Living people
South Korean female weightlifters
Olympic weightlifters of South Korea
Weightlifters at the 2004 Summer Olympics
Weightlifters at the 2008 Summer Olympics
Weightlifters at the 2012 Summer Olympics
World Weightlifting Championships medalists
World record setters in weightlifting
Olympic gold medalists for South Korea
Olympic silver medalists for South Korea
Olympic bronze medalists for South Korea
Korea University alumni
Olympic medalists in weightlifting
Asian Games medalists in weightlifting
Weightlifters at the 2002 Asian Games
Weightlifters at the 2006 Asian Games
Weightlifters at the 2010 Asian Games
Medalists at the 2012 Summer Olympics
Medalists at the 2008 Summer Olympics
Medalists at the 2004 Summer Olympics
Asian Games gold medalists for South Korea
Asian Games silver medalists for South Korea
Medalists at the 2002 Asian Games
Medalists at the 2006 Asian Games
Medalists at the 2010 Asian Games
Indong Jang clan
People from Wonju
20th-century South Korean women
21st-century South Korean women